Norman Pinney (October 21, 1804 in Simsbury, Connecticut – October 1, 1862 in New Orleans, Louisiana) was an American teacher, minister, and author.

He graduated from Yale College in 1823. In 1826 he became a tutor in Trinity College, Hartford, Connecticut, and in 1828, Professor of the Ancient Languages in the same institution. This position he relinquished in 1831.

Pinney was admitted by Bishop Brownell to the ministry of the Protestant Episcopal Church, and was settled for a time at Mobile, Alabama but coming to differ from the doctrines of that church, he gave up his charge and devoted himself to the education of the young.

He was the author of a well known series of text-books for instruction in the French Language.

1804 births
1862 deaths
American male writers
People from Simsbury, Connecticut
Yale College alumni
Trinity College (Connecticut) faculty
American Episcopal priests
19th-century American Episcopalians
19th-century American clergy